Tropical Depression is a four-song EP released by Elephant Micah in February 2006 for his spring mini-tour. The CD was a limited edition of 100 (now sold out) that came in a numbered, potato-stamped sleeve.

Track listing
"Ways"
"Old Globe/Gentle Riders"
"Soberer"
"Passage"

2006 EPs
Elephant Micah albums